Murray Attaway (born November 30, 1957) is an American musician, best known as the lead singer and guitarist for the Marietta, Georgia alternative jangle pop rock band Guadalcanal Diary. After the band's breakup, Attaway recorded one solo album, titled In Thrall, which was released by DGC Records in 1993, produced by Tony Berg. An alternate version of the track "Allegory" from In Thrall was included on DGC Rarities, Vol. 1.

As a film composer, Attaway has written music for a number of independent films as well as having songs placed in numerous films and television shows.

Attaway was born in Atlanta, Georgia and attended Marietta High School.

In 2019, Attaway created the satirical "Dazzle Dudes" podcast which tells the story of a fictional group of inept young males who attempt to start a glam rock band in central Georgia in the 1970s. The show is written, performed and produced by Attaway.

Discography

with Guadalcanal diary

Solo

Scores

References

External links 
 https://www.dazzledudes.com

Living people
American rock guitarists
American male guitarists
Singers from Georgia (U.S. state)
American rock singers
Guitarists from Georgia (U.S. state)
1957 births